Alberico da Romano (1196 – 26 August 1260), called Alberico II, was an Italian condottiero, troubadour, and an alternatingly Guelph and Ghibelline statesman. He was also a patron of Occitan literature.

Biography
Alberico was born in the castle of San Zenone to Ezzelino II da Romano and Adelaide Alberti di Mangona. He was brother of Ezzelino III and Cunizza. He married twice. From his first marriage, to a noblewoman from Vicenza named Beatrice, he had one daughter, Adelaide, who married Rinaldo d'Este in 1235, and five sons: Ezzelino, killed in battle in 1243; Alberico; Romano; Ugolino; and Giovanni. From his second marriage to Margherita he had three daughters: Griselda, Tornalisce, and Amabilia.

Politically allied with his brother Ezzelino, Alberico served as podestà of Vicenza on behalf of the Emperor Frederick II in 1227. In 1239 he became detached from the Ghibelline faction and allied with the Guelph Guecellone da Camino. That same year he aided the Milanese against the emperor. In 1240, as a Guelph, he conquered Treviso and became its podestà, governing it as a Ghibelline until 1257. Pope Alexander IV excommunicated him and, in 1259, on the death of his brother following the Battle of Cassano d'Adda, he was chased from the city of Treviso and took refuge in the castle of San Zenone with most of his family.

On 25 August 1260 the Guelph troops of Venice, Trent, Padua, and Vicenza invested San Zenone. Completely circled and with no possibility of mounting a defence, Alberico surrendered in the hopes of saving his and his relatives' lives. The hatred his brother had incurred, however, was too great. The following day his sons, some still young children, were chopped to pieces before his eyes while he languished in chains. His female relatives were paraded naked through the streets and then burned alive. Alberico, having been forced to assist in their execution, was then tortured with hot irons, tied to the tail of a horse, and dragged through the streets of Treviso until dead. The chronicler Salimbene de Adam recorded that "Vidi ista oculis meis" ("I saw this with my own eyes").

Poetry
Alberico was a friend and patron of troubadours and an Occitan poet himself. He is known to have had contact with Sordello and Uc de Saint Circ. Folios 153r to 211r of the chansonnier known as MS D, now α, R.4.4 in the Biblioteca Estense, Modena, form the Liber Alberici ("Book of Alberic"). The Liber'''s rubric reads: Hec sunt inceptiones cantionum de libro qui fuit domini Alberici et nomini repertorum earundem cantionem. The chansonnier was produced in 1254 in Lombardy under Alberico's patronage.

Alberico has been identified as the author of the poem Na Maria, pretç e fina valors. The rubric identifies the composer as one nabieiris de roman (or nabietris...), which could be a corruption of N'Albric de Roman; however, the name is usually considered a corruption of "Beatriz" and the poem is assigned to Bieiris de Romans by most scholars today. Alberico does have one other work extant, a tenso he composed with Uc: Mesier Albric, so.m prega Ardisons.

Alberico also has a connexion to the Sicilian School of poetry. The man he replaced at Treviso was the Sicilian poet Jacopo de Morra di Puglia.

Sources
Bertoni, Giulio. I Trovatori d'Italia: Biografie, testi, tradizioni, note''. Rome: Società Multigrafica Editrice Somu, 1967 [1915].

External links
PDF of Estense Library's manuscript alfa.r.4.4

1196 births
1260 deaths
People from the Province of Treviso
13th-century condottieri
People excommunicated by the Catholic Church
13th-century Italian troubadours
Executed Italian people
13th-century executions
People executed by torture
People executed by the Republic of Venice
Alberico 02
Italian literature patrons